Bruno Boin (born ) is an American former basketball player known for his college career at the University of Washington in the 1950s. He was an NCAA All-American in 1957 as well as a first-team all-Pacific Coast Conference choice in 1958.

A native of Seattle, Washington, Boin starred at Franklin High School, guiding his team to a state championship as a junior in 1954 before embarking on his college career. In Boin's three seasons as a Washington Husky he scored 1,336 points, was twice a team captain, and earned numerous all-conference and all-district honors. He dropped out of school before the start of the 1957–58 season in order to preserve his NCAA eligibility; the school had been caught violating recruiting regulations the year before and were going to be placed in a one-year postseason ban.  However he returned to graduate and later went on to post graduate work at UCLA.  During his collegiate career he played for the Amateur Athletic Union's Buchan Bakers and won an AAU national championship with them during the 1955–56 season. He was selected in the NBA Draft in both 1958 (St. Louis Hawks) and 1959 (Detroit Pistons) but never played in the league due to a bad back.

Boin went into the actuarial business for 33 years and retired in 1998. As of February 2005 he was splitting his time in retirement between Whidbey Island and Palm Desert, California. He was inducted into the University of Washington's Hall of Fame in 1992 and named to their All-Century Team in 2002.

Boin is married to Sheila Dolan Boin and they have three children, Patrick Christopher Boin b-1965, Mari Boin b-1968, and Leslie Madelon Boin  b-1969

References

1930s births
Living people
All-American college men's basketball players
Amateur Athletic Union men's basketball players
American men's basketball players
Basketball players from Seattle
Centers (basketball)
Detroit Pistons draft picks
People from Island County, Washington
People from Palm Desert, California
St. Louis Hawks draft picks
Washington Huskies men's basketball players
Franklin High School (Seattle) alumni